Baldwin County High School is a public high school that serves grades 9-12 in Bay Minette, Baldwin County, Alabama, United States. It is part of the Baldwin County Public Schools.

BCHS is an Apple Distinguished school. Students received MacBook Air laptops during the 2013-2014 school year.

Baldwin County High School serves the city of Bay Minette and the unincorporated communities of Bromley, Crossroads, Perdido, Pine Grove, Stapleton, Stockton, White House Fork, among others.

The school's mascot is the tiger.

Feeder patterns
The following schools feed into Baldwin County High School:
 Perdido School
 Bay Minette Middle School
 Bay Minette Intermediate School
 Stapleton Elementary School
 Vaughn Elementary School
 Delta Elementary School
 Pine Grove Elementary School

Notable alumni
 Wallace Gilberry, NFL defensive end for the Cincinnati Bengals and formerly for the University of Alabama's Crimson Tide
 Todd Grisham, Current UFC analyst ;Former ESPN anchor and commentator for World Wrestling Entertainment
 Anthony Mix, NFL wide receiver who played for the Washington Redskins and Tampa Bay Buccaneers; previously wide receiver at Auburn University
 Bill Barrow, political reporter for the Associated Press who has extensively interviewed presidential candidates and other political leaders

References

External links
Baldwin County High School website
Greatschools.net profile

Public high schools in Alabama
Schools in Baldwin County, Alabama